Porthdinllaen (in English sometimes Porth Dinllaen) is a small coastal village on the Llŷn Peninsula in the Dwyfor area of Gwynedd, Wales, built on a small promontory, and historically in Caernarfonshire. It is near the larger village of Morfa Nefyn.

It has been owned by the National Trust since 1994. With views across to Yr Eifl and Snowdonia, Porthdinllaen, with Nefyn and Morfa Nefyn, forms a  bay. There are only about two dozen buildings at Porthdinllaen, with the Tŷ Coch Inn at the centre of the village.

Vehicular access to the village is restricted to residents with a car permit; visitors must walk across the beach from Morfa Nefyn or across the Nefyn & District Golf Club golf course on top of the headland, past the Iron Age hill fort.

Port 
The harbour is sheltered by a headland jutting out to the north from all but a north-easterly wind, and as the only such haven on the Llŷn Peninsula, it has been used for many centuries of trading, and as a place to run to for shelter in a storm.

In May 1806, a parliamentary bill approved new buildings when it seemed that Porthdinllaen would be chosen as the port on the route to Ireland, rather than Holyhead, Anglesey. Porthdinllaen was almost as far west as Holyhead, but Holyhead was more accessible, because of Thomas Telford's road developments. Porthdinllaen Harbour Company was formed in 1808 in preparation, by the Jones Parry family of the Madryn estate (the company's assets included the village and the harbour), but the bill before Parliament to constitute Porthdinllaen as a harbour for Irish trade was rejected in 1810.

Pig farming was important to the economy of the Llŷn Peninsula, and Porthdinllaen was the main point of export to Liverpool. In 1830, the farmers and merchants asked the Madryn estate to build a bigger pier, but the estate refused. The first steamer, the Vale of Clwyd, did not therefore enter service until 1832. Apart from goods intended for the local population and the farmers, Porthdinllaen imported large quantities of salt to create the Nefyn herring.

Shipbuilding 
At first mostly small sloops were built in Porthdinllaen but in response to the demand for bigger ships schooners and the occasional brigantine were built there, such as in 1786 the 95-ton brigantine Maria and in 1866 the 287-ton barque Robert Jones. In 1876 the 149-ton brigantine Annie Lloyd was the last vessel built there.

Railway proposals
After the failure of the proposal to create a point of embarkation to Ireland, various proposals were made to build railways to serve the harbour at Porthdinllaen. However, none was eventually constructed:

1830 – Samuel Holland, a slate quarry owner at Rhiw, joined Henry Archer, a businessman from Dublin, to promote the Ffestiniog Railway, incorporated by Act of Parliament on 23 May 1832
1845 – The Worcester and Porth-Dynllaen Railway informed the Rev. T. Parry Jones Parry of an application to Parliament of a railway track from Worcester to Porthdinllaen
1845 – The North Wales Railway Co. planned to construct  of track from Bangor to Porthdinllaen
1860 – The Aberystwith and Welsh Coast Railway Company wanted to construct a line from Aberystwyth to Porthdinllaen. The line to Pwllheli was completed c.1876 but the final five miles were not built.
1877 – The Cambrian Railways Act revived the powers conferred by the Aberystwyth and Welsh Coast Railway Act 1862 for the final 5 miles from Pwllheli

Lifeboat station

In the 19th century, north Wales lacked good roads, so the sea was the easiest way to access many places. Porthdinllaen, on the northern coast of the Llŷn peninsula, with its sheltered north-facing bay, became important as a harbour of refuge and a busy port, with over 700 ships passing through the port in 1861. After storms in 1863, the local parish priest wrote to the Royal National Lifeboat Institution to request that a lifeboat be positioned in the harbour.

The boatshed and slip were commissioned in 1864. Manned constantly since, the current coxswain is Mike Davies, who has served as coxswain since 2004.

The Tyne class lifeboat Hetty Rampton, in service since 27 April 1987, was replaced by a new Tamar class lifeboat, John D Spicer, in 2012.

Film location
Because of its highly preserved and yet maintained status, Porthdinllaen regularly acts as a film and television shooting location. In September 2004 it posed as a Scottish fishing village for the Demi Moore romantic thriller Half Light.

References

External links

 Official website - National Trust Information

Ports and harbours of Wales
Villages in Gwynedd
National Trust properties in Wales
Tourist attractions in Gwynedd
Seaside resorts in Wales
Nefyn